Sang-e Atash or Sang Atash or Sang Atesh may refer to:

Iran
 Sang-e Atash, Fariman, Razavi Khorasan Province
 Sang-e Atash, Mashhad, Razavi Khorasan Province
 Sang-e Atash, Torbat-e Jam, Razavi Khorasan Province

Elsewhere
 Sang Atesh, Ab Kamari, Ab Kamari District, Badghis Province, Afghanistan